Sarykamysh may refer to:
Sarıqamış, Neftchala, Azerbaijan
Sarıqamış, Samukh, Azerbaijan
Sarygamysh Lake, in Turkmenistan
Sary-Kamysh, Batken, village in Kadamjay District, Batken Region, Kyrgyzstan
Sary-Kamysh, Ak-Suu, village in Ak-Suu District, Issyk-Kul Region, Kyrgyzstan
Sary-Kamysh, Issyk-Kul, village in Issyk-Kul District, Issyk-Kul Region, Kyrgyzstan
Sary-Kamysh, Jalal-Abad, village in Nooken District, Jalal-Abad Region, Kyrgyzstan
Sary-Kamysh, Osh, village in Kara-Kulja District, Osh Region, Kyrgyzstan